Jawara is the English transcription of a surname of Manding origin (the French transcription is Diawara).  Notable people with the name include:

People
 Augusta Jawara (1924-1981), Gambian nurse, playwright and activist for women's rights
 Bomba Jawara, Sierra Leonean politician
 Dawda Jawara (born 1924), prime minister and president of Gambia
 Jali Musa Jawara (aka Djeli Moussa Diawara; born 1962), Guinean musician
 Fatim Jawara, Gambia footballer
 Karamo Jawara (born 1991), Norwegian basketball player

Arts and entertainment
 Jawara (TV series), a 2016 Indonesian soap opera television series

See also
Diawara (disambiguation)
Jarawa

Surnames of African origin